Nompumelelo Ntuli Zuma is the former First Lady of South Africa, and is the second current wife in a polygamous marriage with Jacob Zuma, the former President of South Africa.

Biography
Zuma’s fourth marriage and second current wife, Nompumelelo Ntuli (MaNtuli) is the mother to three of his children, before she married him in 2008 at a traditional ceremony which received plenty of media attention in the run-up to Zuma’s bid for the presidency. She has three children: Manqoba Kholwani, Sinqobile, Thandisiwe.

Ban from compound
In 2015, it was alleged she was part of a plot to poison her husband, then-president Jacob Zuma. In result, she was banned from the Nkandla homestead. She was detained by the State Security Agency, allegedly unlawfully, and was released later. Later investigations found no evidence of the poisoning or her role in it. The exact circumstances of her detention are under investigation.

References

First Ladies of South Africa
Jacob Zuma
Living people
Year of birth missing (living people)